The Rochester Journal-American was an American newspaper in Rochester, New York owned by William Randolph Hearst.

History
The Rochester Evening Journal began operations in 1922, as part of an statewide expansion planned by Hearst, who was eyeing a gubernatorial seat. The Sunday edition was known as the Rochester American.

During the early 1930s, the paper came under scrutiny for flouting Section 7-a of the National Recovery Act, which certified workers' rights to form labor unions. After three weeks of conferences with the fledgling Newspaper Guild, the newspaper's management posted on the bulletin board notice that read in part: 

The paper ceased publication in 1937, when Hearst sold the paper to the Gannetts, owners of the Journal-American'''s rival papers.

Notable personnel
Sometime prior to 1935, the Rochester Journal-American was published by Meyer Jacobstein, Ph.D.

Journalist, author and poet Arch Merrill, who would be a reporter and editor at the Rochester Democrat and Chronicle for 27 years beginning in 1937, worked at the Rochester Journal-American from 1927 to 1937.Hughes, James P. "Down-Home Bard: Finger Lakes Great Arch Merrill", Life in the Finger Lakes magazine, Winter 2008. Accessed January 20, 2001. WebCitation archive.

Joe Simon, who with Jack Kirby would create the comic-book character Captain America in 1940, had his first job out of high school at the Journal-American'' in 1932. He was hired by art director Adolph Edler as an assistant, replacing Simon's future comics colleague Al Liederman, who had quit. In-between production duties, Simon did occasional sports and editorial cartoons for the paper.

References

Defunct newspapers published in New York (state)
Newspapers published in Rochester, New York
Hearst Communications publications